K63 or K-63 may refer to:

K-63 (Kansas highway), a state highway in Kansas
HMS Picotee (K63), a UK Royal Navy ship